Thorstrand is a historic estate located in Madison, Wisconsin. It was listed on the National Register of Historic Places in 1980 and on the State Register of Historic Places in 1989.

History
Originally  of cornfield, the land was purchased in the 1890s by Magnus Swenson (1854-1936), a Norwegian who immigrated to America at age 14, and made his way from working as a blacksmith's helper to a career as a chemical engineer, an internationally known inventor, businessman and humanitarian.  Among his many achievements, Swenson patented over 200 machines and processes, built hydroelectric dams on the Wisconsin River, and founded the Norwegian-American Steamship Lines.

Magnus Swenson named the property “Thorstrand” (which means “Thor’s Beach” in Norwegian) after the place where he grew up in Norway.  The road from University Ave through this land still bears the name Thorstrand Rd.

Magnus, his wife Annie and their four daughters, lived near the capitol square in Madison and would make regular trips to the property to picnic and plant a variety of trees, until 1922, when they had two Mediterranean Revival style homes built there, designed by Madison Architects Law and Law.  One house was for Magnus and Annie Swenson (#2 Thorstrand Rd.), the other for his married daughter, Mary Swenson North (#1 Thorstrand Rd).

Over the years, some of the land was sold.  After Mary Swenson North died in 1977, the remaining 15.29 acre estate was sold to the City of Madison in 1978, to be preserved as an addition to “Marshall Park”, for use as a passive recreation area.  When it was learned that the homes would likely be demolished, they were declared Madison Historic Landmarks, protecting them from such a fate.

The homes were subsequently sold to individuals, but the land continues to be owned by the city and a portion associated with each home is leased to the homeowner through a 99-year land lease agreement.  Mary Swenson North's daughter, Mary North O’Hare, bought back her mother's home, and it has remained in the family since that time.  In 2011, Mary North O’Hare died, and at the time of this writing, (September 2018) the home had just been put on the market for sale.

References
Reference 3 note: original corn field acreage was 50 (see reference 5, item 8 continuation sheet); 15 acres was the size of the estate when sold to the City of Madison in 1978 (see reference 5, item 7).

External links 

The Historical Marker Database
The Magnus Swenson Trees

Houses on the National Register of Historic Places in Wisconsin
National Register of Historic Places in Madison, Wisconsin
Houses in Madison, Wisconsin
Houses completed in 1922